KVMZ (99.1 FM) is a radio station licensed to Waldo, Arkansas. The station broadcasts a country music format and is owned by Noalmark Broadcasting Corporation.

References

External links
KVMZ's website

VMZ
Country radio stations in the United States
Noalmark Broadcasting Corporation radio stations
Columbia County, Arkansas